Robert Tait may refer to:

Robert Lawson Tait (1845–1899), British medical pioneer
Bobby Tait (born 1938), Scottish footballer
Bobby Tait (Cowdenbeath footballer) (c. 1886–1950), Scottish footballer
Robert Tait (captain) (fl. 1793), Scottish naval officer

See also
Robert J. Tait Elementary School

Robert Tate (disambiguation)